Fusidane or 29-norprotostane is a tetracyclic triterpene and the parent structure of a series of steroids, such as the antibiotic fusidic acid.

See also
 Protostane
 Dammarane 
 Cucurbitane

References

Triterpenes